Gudur–Renigunta section connects  and  in the Indian state of Andhra Pradesh. Further, this section connects Howrah–Chennai main line at Gudur and Guntakal–Renigunta section at Renigunta.

History 
It was owned by Madras and Southern Mahratta Railway. The section is a broad-gauge railway line which was opened on 23 August 1957. The line was sanctioned in the year 1997–98.

Jurisdiction 
This branch line is having a length of  under the Guntakal railway division, excluding  of Vijayawada railway division under South Central Railway zone.

References 

Rail transport in Andhra Pradesh

1957 establishments in Andhra Pradesh
Transport in Tirupati
Railway lines opened in 1957
5 ft 6 in gauge railways in India